Yogesh Singh is an Indian academic who is the current and 23rd Vice-Chancellor of University of Delhi.

Career and professional activities
He is the former Vice Chancellor of Delhi Technological University (DTU). Prior to joining DTU in 2015, he served as the Director of Netaji Subhash Institute of Technology-NSIT (now known as Netaji Subhash University of Technology) from 2014 to 2017. He served as the Vice-Chancellor of The Maharaja Sayajirao University of Baroda from 2011 to 2014. From 2001 to 2006, Professor Singh served as the Dean of Information Technology at Guru Gobind Singh Indraprastha University.

References

Indian academic administrators
Year of birth missing (living people)
Living people